Bayanjavyn Damdinjav (born 9 November 1935) is a Mongolian biathlete. He competed at the 1964 Winter Olympics and the 1968 Winter Olympics.

References

External links
 

1935 births
Living people
Mongolian male biathletes
Mongolian male cross-country skiers
Olympic biathletes of Mongolia
Olympic cross-country skiers of Mongolia
Biathletes at the 1964 Winter Olympics
Biathletes at the 1968 Winter Olympics
Cross-country skiers at the 1964 Winter Olympics
People from Khövsgöl Province
20th-century Mongolian people